Saint Kentigern College is a private co-educational Presbyterian secondary school in the suburb of Pakuranga on the eastern side of Auckland, New Zealand, beside the Tamaki Estuary. It is operated by the Saint Kentigern Trust Board which also operates Saint Kentigern Boys' School, Saint Kentigern Girls' School and Saint Kentigern Preschool based at two different campuses in Remuera.

Established in 1953, the college is semi-coeducational with a single-gender Middle College for years 7 and 8, with years 9 and 10 single-gender in core subjects and a co-educational Senior College for years 11–13.

Kentigern (or Mungo) is the patron Saint of Glasgow. In 2003, the college introduced girls into the school for the first time with 140 female students; these were known as the foundation girls. There are now over 900 female students attending, with numbers increasing every year.

Saint Kentigern College is an IB World School offering the IB Diploma Programme for Year 12 and 13 students. The Saint Kentigern Trust Board approved the decision in late 2006. The course was first offered to Year 12 students in 2009.

History
Saint Kentigern College opened in 1953 on a rural site  from the centre of Auckland, bordering the waters of the Tamaki Estuary. With ninety foundation pupils and a staff of four, the College was the realisation of a dream for a group of Presbyterian ministers and laymen who had established the Saint Kentigern Trust in 1949 to found a school for 'the acquisition of knowledge, for the glory of God, and the benefit of mankind, a proper discipline of mind and body, and a life of service to others.' The College took the name of the patron saint of Glasgow, Saint Kentigern, who is also affectionately known in Scotland as Mungo.

The foundation Headmaster of the College, chosen in 1952, was a Scottish minister, the Reverend Adam MacFarlan. With a distinguished academic record at the University of Glasgow and a Military Cross from active service in World War II, MacFarlan led the College from its beginnings until his retirement in 1983. In 1972 he was awarded the Doctor of Divinity degree by his old university for services to education in New Zealand, and on his retirement was appointed an Officer of the Order of the British Empire, for services to education and the community, in the 1983 Queen's Birthday Honours.

As its second Headmaster, Saint Kentigern College chose an Old Boy, Nigel Toy. During his leadership, the College grew from 700 to over 1000 students and a building programme saw significant new facilities, including the Sir William Goodfellow Memorial Library and a new classroom block, as well as refurbished dormitories and new residential lodges at Bruce House, the College boarding hostel, where Toy had once been Head Prefect.

In 1997, Toy left New Zealand to take up a leadership position at St George's School, Vancouver, British Columbia, Canada, and was succeeded as Headmaster at Saint Kentigern by the Reverend David Williams, formerly Chaplain to the College. In his four years as Headmaster, he led major initiatives in pastoral care and information technology. Major landscaping changes enabled the development of the  Saint Kentigern Old Boys' Sports Centre as well as a range of new sports fields, and opened the way for the possibility of girls' education at Saint Kentigern in its second half-century.

Williams left in 2001 when he was appointed Headmaster of Kinross-Wollaroi School in Orange, New South Wales, Australia. He was succeeded by Warren Peat, who from a background of teaching in New Zealand co-educational schools was charged with leading the College in its introduction of girls and significant campus development. With Peat in the position of Executive Head, Saint Kentigern College was restructured as a Senior School and Middle School and the roll rose to over 1600 boys and girls. As well as the Elizabeth MacFarlan Centre for girls, the magnificent Art and Technology complex and the extensively re-developed Music and Science buildings provided impressive specialist facilities for an expanding College. Peat attracted a large staff of men and women, highly qualified across a wide range of subject disciplines, and challenged both staff and students to set the highest standards in all their endeavours. Major academic initiatives under his leadership saw both strong achievement in NCEA assessments and the endorsement of the College as an IB World School, authorised to teach the International Baccalaureate Diploma Programme.

Saint Kentigern College Executive Head Warren Peat left at the end of 2008 to become headmaster of John Paul College, near Brisbane, Australia. He stated that there was "an offer he couldn't refuse". Stephen Cole then took up the role of headmaster. Cole left Saint Kentigern at the end of Term 1, 2017. The position of Head of College was then disestablished and replaced with separate positions for Principal of Middle College (Years 7–10) and Principal of Senior College (Years 11–13). At the same time a new role as Head of Saint Kentigern was created with former headmaster of Rangitoto College, David Hodge taking up the position. In 2019, the Saint Kentigern Trust Board decided to move away from the separate middle college and senior college model, returning to a single college structure. Russell Brooke, formerly the principal of ACG Parnell College, was appointed as the new principal of Saint Kentigern College. Brooke resigned in October 2021, following a period of unexplained leave which had been in effect from August 2021. Subsequently, Duncan McQueen assumed the role of acting principal until Damon Emtage joined Saint Kentigern College as principal in January 2023. Emtage previously worked in several independent schools in Australia, including Brisbane Grammar School and Wesley College Melbourne.

School structure
The school's houses are named after Scottish Presbyterian church members, each of whom died for their cause (martyrs), and could be considered to have given their all for their faith. Students are allocated into one of the six houses and compete throughout the year in house competitions. They are called:
Wishart for George Wishart (yellow)
Hamilton for Patrick Hamilton (red)
Chalmers for James Chalmers (blue)
Cargill for Donald Cargill (green)
Wilson for Margaret Wilson (purple)
 Stark for Helen Stark (teal)

Sport
Several high performance sports personalities and coaches based around the world have attended Saint Kentigern. The school has a tennis and golf academy for students who excel in the two sports respectively. Saint Kentigern has dominated tennis, golf, rugby, cycling and triathlon competitions in the last decade. Many school teams such as the rugby, hockey and cricket teams play in the top grades, while the Cycling and Triathlon programme (under the governance of Mr Rick Faulding) has thrived.  Saint Kentigern College holds several Auckland cycling records and national titles. In triathlon, the College has many national titles also.

Rugby
Saint Kentigern College is noted for its rugby presence, producing All Blacks such as Joe Rokocoko, John Afoa and Jerome Kaino, all of whom were members of the Auckland 1A 1XV championship side in 2001. The 1st XV are previous holders of the Moascar cup. Firstly in 1981, defeating Wesley, and again in 1999 when they defeated, the then World champion, Kelston Boys 18- 14. Other notable years were in 1996, 1998 and 2000 where they were Runners up in the 1A competition. 2001 saw the 1st XV eclipse the previous year's 1A competition and storm the championship in their defeat of King's College in the final. The 1st XV was relegated from 1A in 2003, but promoted back to the premier grade in 2005 after going undefeated in the 1B competition. Since then Saint Kentigern College has had a profound impact and presence on the current Auckland 1A competition. The Saint Kentigern 1st XV won back to back 1A titles in 2011 and 2012, its first Top 4 National Championship in 2012, and back to back Co-educational National Titles in 2010 and 2011. As a result of winning the Top 4 National Final, the 2013 First XV had been invited to the Sanix Youth World Invitational Tournament. The tournament was staged in early May, where the 1st XV defeated Hartpury College to take the world championship title. The team then went on to win their third consecutive Auckland 1A title in 2013 with a last-minute penalty. They became the first-ever side to win a three-peat of 1A rugby titles. Saint Kentigern has also gone on to win the 2015 and 2017 Auckland 1A competition. In 2019 Saint Kentigern won the CO-ED division in the national 1XV Championships beating Feilding High School 29-22.

Notable Alumni of the Rugby Program include John Afoa, Joe Rokocoko, Jerome Kaino, Steve Surridge, and Seta Tamanivalu who have represented New Zealand (All Blacks). Another notable player who had attended Saint Kentigern for a short time was Kieran Read. In more recent times there has been a resurgence in Saint Kentigern old boys playing at Super Rugby level. TJ Faiane, Sione Mafileo, Matt Duffie, Dalton Papalii, Sam Nock, Blake Gibson, Finlay Christie, and Tanielu Tele’a are Saint Kentigern old boys in the current Blues (Super Rugby) squad. Other former St. Kentigern old boys who play in the Super Rugby competition are: Etene Nanai-Seturo - Chiefs (rugby union), Tiaan Tauakipulu - New South Wales Waratahs, Ere Enari - Crusaders (rugby union), Braydon Ennor - Crusaders (rugby union), Pari Pari Parkinson - Highlanders (rugby union), Tevita Mafileo - Hurricanes (rugby union) and Scott Scrafton - Hurricanes (rugby union). In addition, there are few old collegians who play in the Premiership Rugby in England and some in the Top 14 (french rugby competition). There is also a couple of old boys playing in the National Rugby League, the 2011 Saint Kentigern's college 1XV captain Albert Vete who currently plays for Melbourne Storm and Suliasi Vunivalu who is also in the current Melbourne Storm team. Vunivalu was dubbed the highest try scorer for the club in 2016. It's been announced that Vunivalu has signed a deal to play for Queensland Reds in the Super Rugby competition starting from 2021. Another notable mention is the Saint Kentigern old boys who are in the current New Zealand national under-20 rugby union team: Rivez Reihana, Tamaiti Williams, and Etene Nanai-Seturo. Rivez and Tamaiti are in the development sides for the chiefs and crusaders respectively.

Demographics
The 2019 Education Review Office (ERO) report states that the school had 2,092 students (28 of which are international). The gender composition was 58% male and 42% female out of which 68% were Pākehā, 14% Chinese, 5% Māori and 13% other ethnic groups.

Notable alumni

 Kirstyn Goodger (born 1991), Olympic rower
 Ross Keenan (born 1943), businessperson

References

External links
Saint Kentigern College Website

Boarding schools in New Zealand
Educational institutions established in 1953
International Baccalaureate schools in New Zealand
Presbyterian schools in New Zealand
Secondary schools in Auckland
1953 establishments in New Zealand
Scottish-New Zealand culture